Jinggangshan University Affiliated High School is a Chinese secondary school in Qingyuan District, Ji'an, Jiangxi. It is affiliated with Jinggangshan University.

References

External links
  Jinggangshan University Affiliated High School

High schools in Jiangxi
Buildings and structures in Ji'an
University-affiliated schools in China